Statistics of Japanese Regional Leagues for the 1970 season.

Champions list

League standings

Kanto

Tokai

Kansai

1970
Jap
Jap
3